Dirck Jacobsz. (1496–1567) was a Dutch Renaissance painter.  His exact birthplace is unknown,  but it was somewhere near Amsterdam.

Career
Born into a family of painters, he was first trained by his father, Jacob Cornelisz van Oostsanen. Jacobsz. was deeply influenced by the Mannerist style of fellow Amsterdam painter Jan van Scorel. His painting The Crossbowmen (1529) was regarded as his most important piece, and was the first militia portrait in Dutch history. He married Marritgen Gerritsdr. in 1550, and they had two children, Maria Dircksdr. and Jacob Dircksz. Jacob later became a painter as well. Не painted two earlier group portraits of civic guards, which hang in the State Hermitage in Saint-Petersburg.

References

External links
 Entry in Amsterdam Rijksmuseum catalogue 

1496 births
1567 deaths
Dutch Renaissance painters
Painters from Amsterdam
Renaissance painters
Early Netherlandish painters